A list of animated feature films released in 2003

Highest-grossing animated films of the year

See also
 List of animated television series of 2003

References

 Feature films
2003
2003-related lists